Howard Devone Payne (November 14, 1913 – March 20, 1958) was an American football coach and college athletics administrator. He served as head football coach at Louisiana College in 1953 and Northeast Louisiana State College—now known as the University of Louisiana at Monroe—serving four seasons, from 1954 to 1957, and compiling a career college football coaching record of 18–29–1. Payne lettered in football, basketball, and track at Louisiana College.

Payne died on March 20, 1958, at a hospital in Monroe, Louisiana, where he had been undergoing surgery for ulcers. In 2007 Payne was inducted into the ULM Sports Hall of Fame. He is also a member of the Louisiana High School Athletic Association, having been inducted in 1992 posthumously.

Head coaching record

College football

References

External links
 

1913 births
1958 deaths
Louisiana Christian Wildcats football coaches
Louisiana Christian Wildcats football players
Louisiana Christian Wildcats men's basketball players
Louisiana–Monroe Warhawks athletic directors
Louisiana–Monroe Warhawks football coaches
College men's track and field athletes in the United States
High school basketball coaches in Louisiana
High school football coaches in Louisiana
People from Franklin Parish, Louisiana
People from Philadelphia, Mississippi
Players of American football from Louisiana
Basketball players from Louisiana
Track and field athletes from Louisiana